Walter Victor Bellamy (November 27, 1881 – July 24, 1941) was a Canadian professional ice hockey player. He played with the Montreal Shamrocks of the National Hockey Association.

References

External links
Walt Bellamy at JustSportsStats

1881 births
1941 deaths
Canadian ice hockey left wingers
Ice hockey people from Ontario
Montreal Shamrocks players
Sportspeople from Clarington